Oben Gunderson Jr. (May 6, 1927 - September 5, 2018) was an American politician who was a member of the North Dakota House of Representatives. He represented the 19th district from 1971 to 1982 as a member of the Republican party. Gunderson attended Concordia College in Moorhead, Minnesota and became a grain farmer and licensed pilot. He lived in McCanna, North Dakota.

References

1927 births
2018 deaths
Republican Party members of the North Dakota House of Representatives
Concordia College (Moorhead, Minnesota) alumni